In Greek mythology, Arethusa (/ˌærɪˈθjuːzə/; Ancient Greek: Ἀρέθουσα means 'war-swift' from arês and thoos) may refer to the following personages:

 Arethusa, one of the 50 Nereids, sea-nymph daughters of the 'Old Man of the Sea' Nereus and the Oceanid Doris. She was counted in the train of Cyrene along with her sister Opis, Deiopea and Ephyra.
Arethusa, a nymph of a spring who was pursued by the river god Alpheus. She was a huntress and attendant of Artemis. She may be the same with the above Arethusa.
Arethusa, one of the Hesperides, daughters of  Nyx and Erebus, or Atlas and Hesperis, or Phorcys and Ceto and lastly of Zeus and Themis.
 Arethusa, the Boeotian daughter of Hyperes, son of Poseidon and the Pleiad Alcyone. She was the mother of Abas, king of the Abantians in Euboea by Poseidon. The god had an intercourse with Arethusa in Boeotian Euripus and was changed into a fountain in Chalcis by Hera.
Arethusa, a Euboean princess as daughter of King Abas and thus, granddaughter of the above Arethusa. She was the sister of Alcon, Dias and probably, of Canethus and Chalcodon.
 Arethusa, a Cretan woman, whose son was killed in the Trojan War. She was married to Thersander and their son was Hyllus.
 Arethusa, one of Actaeon's dogs.

Notes

References 

 Apollodorus, The Library with an English Translation by Sir James George Frazer, F.B.A., F.R.S. in 2 Volumes, Cambridge, MA, Harvard University Press; London, William Heinemann Ltd. 1921. . Online version at the Perseus Digital Library. Greek text available from the same website.
Apollonius Rhodius, Argonautica translated by Robert Cooper Seaton (1853-1915), R. C. Loeb Classical Library Volume 001. London, William Heinemann Ltd, 1912. Online version at the Topos Text Project.
 Apollonius Rhodius, Argonautica. George W. Mooney. London. Longmans, Green. 1912. Greek text available at the Perseus Digital Library.
 Diodorus Siculus, The Library of History translated by Charles Henry Oldfather. Twelve volumes. Loeb Classical Library. Cambridge, Massachusetts: Harvard University Press; London: William Heinemann, Ltd. 1989. Vol. 3. Books 4.59–8. Online version at Bill Thayer's Web Site
 Diodorus Siculus, Bibliotheca Historica. Vol 1-2. Immanel Bekker. Ludwig Dindorf. Friedrich Vogel. in aedibus B. G. Teubneri. Leipzig. 1888-1890. Greek text available at the Perseus Digital Library.
 Gaius Julius Hyginus, Astronomica from The Myths of Hyginus translated and edited by Mary Grant. University of Kansas Publications in Humanistic Studies. Online version at the Topos Text Project.
 Gaius Julius Hyginus, Fabulae from The Myths of Hyginus translated and edited by Mary Grant. University of Kansas Publications in Humanistic Studies. Online version at the Topos Text Project.
 Hesiod, Catalogue of Women from Homeric Hymns, Epic Cycle, Homerica translated by Evelyn-White, H G. Loeb Classical Library Volume 57. London: William Heinemann, 1914. Online version at theio.com
 Hesiod, Theogony from The Homeric Hymns and Homerica with an English Translation by Hugh G. Evelyn-White, Cambridge, MA.,Harvard University Press; London, William Heinemann Ltd. 1914. Online version at the Perseus Digital Library. Greek text available from the same website.
 Maurus Servius Honoratus, In Vergilii carmina comentarii. Servii Grammatici qui feruntur in Vergilii carmina commentarii; recensuerunt Georgius Thilo et Hermannus Hagen. Georgius Thilo. Leipzig. B. G. Teubner. 1881. Online version at the Perseus Digital Library.
 Marcus Tullius Cicero, Nature of the Gods from the Treatises of M.T. Cicero translated by Charles Duke Yonge (1812-1891), Bohn edition of 1878. Online version at the Topos Text Project.
 Marcus Tullius Cicero, De Natura Deorum. O. Plasberg. Leipzig. Teubner. 1917.  Latin text available at the Perseus Digital Library.
 Publius Ovidius Naso, Metamorphoses translated by Brookes More (1859-1942). Boston, Cornhill Publishing Co. 1922. Online version at the Perseus Digital Library.
 Publius Ovidius Naso, Metamorphoses. Hugo Magnus. Gotha (Germany). Friedr. Andr. Perthes. 1892. Latin text available at the Perseus Digital Library.
 Quintus Smyrnaeus, The Fall of Troy translated by Way. A. S. Loeb Classical Library Volume 19. London: William Heinemann, 1913. Online version at theio.com
 Quintus Smyrnaeus, The Fall of Troy. Arthur S. Way. London: William Heinemann; New York: G.P. Putnam's Sons. 1913. Greek text available at the Perseus Digital Library.
 Stephanus of Byzantium, Stephani Byzantii Ethnicorum quae supersunt, edited by August Meineike (1790-1870), published 1849. A few entries from this important ancient handbook of place names have been translated by Brady Kiesling. Online version at the Topos Text Project.

 Nereids
Naiads
Hesperides
Princesses in Greek mythology
Boeotian characters in Greek mythology
Cretan characters in Greek mythology
Boeotian mythology
Cretan mythology